Teddy Blass (born April 16, 1984 in Dallas) is an American film composer and record producer.

Biography
Teddy Blass was born in Dallas, Texas. He studied music throughout his youth, and went on to receive degrees in Music Production and Digital Media. He graduated from the University of Central Florida in 2008. Blass started off in the music business as an in-house producer for FlatFoot Records in Orlando, Florida. He co-produced EP albums for bands such as Early Next Year and Kingsbury. He also worked as an assistant engineer on Pretty Ugly's debut album Walk a Mile in My Shoes. Blass also served as the Vice President of Graphics at the label for a short period of time.

In 2009, Teddy Blass did a remix for Ace of Base. Later that year he started writing music for a number of short films, including the micro-short Confession, which was based on the short story At Confession by Harvey Stanbrough. The next year, Teddy Blass and Grammy nominee Justin Boller started a production team together. Their first project was creating the Playoffs Theme Song for the Orlando Magic. In 2011, Blass earned a nomination for the Golden Tripod Award for Best Soundtrack for his score to the film FunMachine. He won and accepted that award in June at the Campus MovieFest International Grand Finale at the Stephen J. Ross Theater in Los Angeles.

In 2012, Blass garnered some attention for the music he wrote in a Funny Or Die video starring Sean Astin.

Filmography

References

External links
Official Site

Teddy Blass at Linkedin

Living people
1984 births
University of Central Florida alumni